A. C. Roper Jr. (born November 6, 1963) is a lieutenant general in the United States Army Reserve and retired police officer who is currently 10th deputy commander of the United States Northern Command (USNORTHCOM) and vice commander of the American element of the North American Aerospace Defense Command (NORAD). Before that, he served as the deputy commanding general of the United States Army Reserve Command (USARC) and prior to that, as deputy chief of the United States Army Reserve. In his civilian career, Roper was chief of the Birmingham Police Department from 2007 to 2017. Roper's promotion makes him the first black United States Army Reserve lieutenant general.

Roper graduated from Phillips High School in Birmingham, Alabama and enrolled at the University of Alabama at Birmingham. He left the university after his sophomore year to join the Montgomery Police Department. Roper eventually completed a bachelor's degree at Troy State University. He later earned an M.S. degree in criminal justice from the University of Alabama and a Master of Strategic Studies degree from the U.S. Army War College.

References

External links

1963 births
Living people
African-American police officers
Military personnel from Birmingham, Alabama
African-American United States Army personnel
Troy University alumni
University of Alabama alumni
United States Army War College alumni
Recipients of the Meritorious Service Medal (United States)
Recipients of the Legion of Merit
United States Army generals
Recipients of the Distinguished Service Medal (US Army)
21st-century African-American people
20th-century African-American people